Octopus Capital Limited, trading as Octopus Group, is a privately held United Kingdom based holding company founded in 2000 by Simon Rogerson, Christopher Hulatt, and Guy Myles as a fund management company. Through its subsidiaries, it operates in the investment management, venture capital, energy, and real estate industries.

As of December 2019, Octopus Group has more than 1.5 million customers and manages more than £12bn on behalf of its investors.

Businesses

Octopus Energy

Octopus Energy was established in 2015 as a retail electricity and gas supplier in the UK, and by December 2019, had over 1.35 million domestic and business customers. Under the Octopus Energy Group brand, it has expanded into energy for business and energy services, and licences its customer handling software to other energy suppliers.

Octopus Renewables
Octopus Renewables owns and manages renewable energy production, particularly in solar and onshore wind. It is one of the largest owners of renewable energy infrastructure in Europe, with £3bn of assets under management. Previously a separate entity within Octopus Group, the company was acquired by Octopus Energy in July 2021. Octopus Renewables is the manager of Octopus Renewables Infrastructure Trust, an investment fund which was floated on the London Stock Exchange in December 2019.

Octopus Ventures
Octopus Ventures is a venture capital fund with £1.2bn of funds under management. Notable Octopus Ventures investments include SwiftKey, Eve Sleep, ManyPets (formerly known as Bought By Many), Lovefilm, Graze, and Zoopla.

Octopus Investments
Octopus Investments is an investment management company which manages a number of investment funds, with some structured as venture capital trusts. It was the first venture capital trust manager to pass £1bn of assets managed within its funds.

Octopus Wealth
Octopus Wealth is a financial advice service launched in 2018. It aims to provide straightforward financial advice with a clear fee structure.

Octopus Real Estate
Octopus Real Estate (formerly known as Octopus Property) provides finance and investment for care homes, retirement villages, residential and commercial properties. It was formed in 2019 by the merger of two existing businesses, Octopus Property and Octopus Healthcare, and had £2bn of funds under management in 2019.

References

External links
 

Holding companies of the United Kingdom
British companies established in 2000